Adrian William Moore (born 1956) is a British philosopher and broadcaster. He is Professor of Philosophy at the University of Oxford and tutorial fellow of St Hugh's College, Oxford. His main areas of interest are Kant, Wittgenstein, history of philosophy, metaphysics, philosophy of mathematics, philosophy of logic and language, ethics and philosophy of religion.

Education 
A. W. Moore was educated at The Manchester Grammar School.  He graduated with a B.A. in philosophy from King's College, Cambridge, after which he went to Oxford, where he studied at Balliol College for his B.Phil and D.Phil. in philosophy, completing the latter with a thesis on Language, Time and Ontology under the supervision of Michael Dummett.  During his time as a postgraduate at Oxford, Moore was awarded the John Locke Prize in Mental Philosophy (in 1980).

Academic career 
After receiving his doctorate, Moore spent three years as a lecturer at University College, Oxford, where he also acted as the junior dean.  He then returned to Cambridge as a junior research fellow at King's College.  Since 1988 he has been a tutorial fellow at St Hugh's College, Oxford, and a university lecturer in philosophy. Since 2004, he has been a university professor of philosophy. He has also been the chairman of the Oxford University Philosophical Society (1995–96), chairman of the Sub-faculty of Philosophy (1997–99), president of the Aristotelian Society (2014–2015) and vice-principal of St Hugh's College, Oxford (2017-2020).

He is currently a delegate of the Oxford University Press, and he has been editor of the journal MIND since 2015, joint with Lucy O'Brien.

Moore was awarded the Mind Association Research Fellowship (1999–2000) and a Leverhulme Major Research Fellowship (2006–09).

In September 2016 he presented a ten-part BBC Radio 4 series entitled A History of the Infinite.

Philosophical work 

One of Moore's distinctive contributions to the area of contemporary metaphysics is a bold defence of the idea that it is possible to think about the world 'from no point of view'. This defence is presented in his book, Points of View, which is at the same time a study of ineffability and nonsense. Drawing on Kant and Wittgenstein, he considers transcendental idealism which, he argues, is nonsense resulting from the attempt to express certain inexpressible insights. He applies this idea to a wide range of fundamental philosophical issues, including the nature of persons, value, and God.

Moore's most recent work has been devoted to a thorough study of the history of metaphysics since Descartes, published under the title The Evolution of Modern Metaphysics: Making Sense of Things. Taking as its definition of metaphysics ‘the most general attempt to make sense of things’, the study charts the evolution of metaphysics through various competing conceptions of its possibility, scope and limits: it deals with the early modern period, the late modern period in the analytic tradition and the late modern period in non-analytic traditions. Moore challenges the still prevalent conviction that there is some unbridgeable gulf between analytic philosophy and philosophy of other kinds. He also advances his own distinctive conception of what metaphysics is and why it matters.

Moore is well known not only for his work in the areas or metaphysics and history of philosophy, but also for his contributions to the philosophy of logic and the philosophy of mathematics. In particular, Moore has done much work on the nature of infinity which illustrates his ramified interests. In his book The Infinite, Moore offers a thorough discussion of the idea of infinity and its history, and a defence of finitism. He engages with a wide range of approaches and issues in the history of thought about the infinite, including various paradoxes, as well as the problems of human finitude and death.

In the areas of ethics and religious philosophy, one of the main questions addressed by Moore is this: Is it possible for ethical thinking to be grounded in pure reason? In Noble in Reason, Infinite in Faculty: Themes and Variations in Kant's Moral and Religious Philosophy, Moore looks at Kant's moral and religious philosophy and uses it to arrive at a distinctive way of understanding and answering this question. Moore identifies three Kantian themes – morality, freedom and religion –  and offers variations on each of these themes in turn. He concedes that there are difficulties with the Kantian view that morality can be governed by ‘pure’ reason, but defends a closely related view involving a notion of reason culturally and socially conditioned.

A collection of some of Moore's essays has been published under the title Language, World, and Limits: Essays in Philosophy of Language and Metaphysics (Oxford: Oxford University Press).

Moore also has a special interest in the work of Bernard Williams, his colleague at Cambridge about whom he has written extensively. After Williams’ death in 2003 Moore was appointed as one of his literary executors. He edited one of Williams’ posthumously published collections of essays, Philosophy as a Humanistic Discipline.

Most recently, Moore completed Gödel´s Theorem: A Very Short Introduction for publication by Oxford University Press (November 2022).

Reception of work 
Described as "one of our very best... contemporary philosophers", Moore published his first book, The Infinite, with Routledge in 1990. The text was considered "an instructive and authoritative overview of a topic of considerable philosophical importance", a "fine book... admirably clear... [subtle and] sensitive to the philosophical issues." According to another reviewer, the book "points to deep and unresolved issues in the philosophy of mathematics and even deeper issues in general philosophy... deserves serious study by both mathematicians and philosophers". In Choice, it was described as "a splendid guide through the intellectual history of this powerful and far-reaching idea... very highly recommended for all readers". The book was also reviewed favourably in International Philosophical Quarterly and Times Higher Education Supplement.

This was followed by Points of View (Oxford University Press 1997): "... a superb book. It brings the rigour, clarity and precision of the best analytical philosophy to bear on a topic that has until now been of pointedly little concern within analytical philosophy." In his review, in The Times Literary Supplement, Robert Brandom regarded it as "imaginative, original and ambitious". According to The European Journal of Philosophy review, the book "tackles some of the most profound and most complex issues in philosophy, and the result is impressive."

His third book, Noble in Reason, Infinite in Faculty: Themes and Variations in Kant's Moral and Religious Philosophy was reviewed very laudatorily in, among others, Mind, The Times Literary Supplement and Kantian Review: "a continuing, deep and detailed discussion with... Kant... an exceptionally thought-provoking and serious book"; a "particularly helpful account of Kant's philosophy of religion", including "numerous provocative insights...".

Moore received accolades also for his work as editor, in particular for Bernard Williams's Philosophy as a Humanistic Discipline: "Editor A. W. Moore... has certainly done the scholarly world a service" (Choice; "this superb collection of essays further demonstrates Williams's greatness... it appropriately honours his philosophical legacy by offering essays that span his entire career" (The Philosophers' Magazine); "we can only be thankful that collections such as this allow discussion with [Williams] to continue".

His monograph The Evolution of Modern Metaphysics: Making Sense of Things was published in 2012 by Cambridge University Press, and it has been called an “important and remarkable book... Everyone interested in metaphysics... ought to read the whole book.” The book is regarded as evincing "the highest qualities of a historian of philosophy... [It] is positively thrilling to see someone engage with thinkers from both [analytic and continental] traditions and bring them into conversation with each other, especially with such dexterity... an extremely impressive achievement... largely succeeds at its dauntingly difficult task". In his review of this volume, John Cottingham writes: "[Moore articulates his story with] extraordinary care and detail... pulls off his [ambitious programme] with a remarkable degree of success... locates his chosen philosophers within a beautifully organised narrative... The fact that fundamental ethical questions... can be raised as a result of Moore's story... is tribute to the brilliance and importance of this book... It is a tribute to the author that [the ideas and systems] are handled with such crystal clarity and with an unpretentious and unassuming seriousness... a kind of model for philosophy at its synoptic best... restores one's faith in the future of the subject". Equally positive reviews were also published in Choice, The Philosophical Quarterly, The Times Literary Supplement, Mind and Analysis and Metaphysics.

Publications

Books 
 1990 The Infinite (London: Routledge). A revised second edition, with a new preface, was published in 2001. A revised third edition with two new chapters and a new appendix was published in 2019.
 1997 Points of View (Oxford: Oxford University Press)
 2003 Noble in Reason, Infinite in Faculty: Themes and Variations in Kant's Moral and Religious Philosophy (London: Routledge)
 2012 The Evolution of Modern Metaphysics: Making Sense of Things (Cambridge: Cambridge University Press)
 2019 Language, World and Limits: Essays in Philosophy of Language and Metaphysics (Oxford: Oxford University Press).
 2022 Gödel´s Theorem: A Very Short Introduction (Oxford: Oxford University Press).

Edited anthologies 
 1993 (ed.) Meaning and Reference (Oxford: Oxford University Press)
 1993 (ed.) Infinity (Aldershot: Dartmouth)
 2006 (ed.) Bernard Williams, Philosophy as a Humanistic Discipline (Princeton: Princeton University Press)
 2012 (co-ed.) Contemporary Kantian Metaphysics: New Essays on Space and Time (Basingstoke: Macmillan)

References

External links 
 Moore’s homepage
 Lecture on infinity to the St Hugh’s College Association of Senior Members
 Podcast on Kant for Philosophy Bites
 Episodes of BBC Radio 4 series A History of the Infinite
 Interview for Clifford Sosis’ website, ‘What is it Like to be a Philosopher?’
 

Living people
1956 births
British philosophers
Christian philosophers
Alumni of King's College, Cambridge
Alumni of Balliol College, Oxford
Fellows of St Hugh's College, Oxford
Philosophers of mind
Philosophy journal editors
Philosophers of religion
Mind (journal) editors